The Samedan–Pontresina railway is a Swiss metre-gauge railway, which is operated by the Rhaetian Railway (Rhätischen Bahn; RhB). The line runs through the Upper Engadine and connects Samedan with Pontresina and provides a link between the Albula Railway and the Bernina Railway. The line is also often considered to be part of the Engadine line from Bever to Scuol-Tarasp with which it is closely linked operationally. The Samedan-Pontresina railway line is part of the RhB mainline network, so the kilometrage (chainage) has its zero point in Landquart.

History
The railway line was opened by the Berninabahn-Gesellschaft (Bernina Railway Company) together with the Pontresina–Morteratsch section on 1 July 1908. It was the only connection until 1 July 1909 between the RhB trunk network and the Bernina Railway, which was already electrified but with direct current. The Samedan–Pontresina line was electrified with 11 kV 16⅔ Hz AC in 1913.

Operations
Pontresina station is a two-system station. The trains from Samedan uses tracks 1 and 2 and the trains on the Bernina Railway use tracks 4 to 7. This allows the entry and exit of trains under the required power system as well as changing system used in the station.

References

Footnotes

Sources

 
 
  (Festschrift for the 100-year anniversary of the line)
 
 
 

Railway lines in Switzerland
Rhaetian Railway lines
Metre gauge railways in Switzerland
Railway lines opened in 1908
1908 establishments in Switzerland
Samedan
Pontresina